M81 or M-81 may refer to:

 M-81 (Michigan highway), a state highway in Michigan
 McDonnell-Douglas MD81
 Messier 81, a spiral galaxy in the constellation Ursa Major, also known as NGC 3031 or Bode's Galaxy
 U.S. Woodland, a camouflage pattern colloquially known as "M81"